Sumapaz may refer to:

 Sumapaz, a locality of Bogotá, Colombia
 Sumapaz Páramo, largest páramo in the world
 Sumapaz Province, province of Cundinamarca, Colombia
 Sumapaz River
 Sumapaz Valley or Sumapaz Region